Oliver James Goodwill (born 25 October 1982) is a British actor and film composer. He is known to have participated in the music video "Call Me When You're Sober" from the album The Open Door of the rock band Evanescence, and portrayed the main character on the TV series Runaway Stars. Goodwill also works in a band called "Melessa Jean", as a songwriter and drummer.

Filmography

References

External links

www.oliver-goodwill.com/music

Living people
1982 births
English male film actors
English male television actors
English male models
English soul singers
People from Swindon
Actors from Swindon
Male actors from Wiltshire
Musicians from Wiltshire
21st-century English singers